Taihe is a town under the administration of Qingxin District, Qingyuan, Guangdong, China. , it has seven residential neighborhoods and 11 villages under its administration:
Neighborhoods
Xiangqun Community
Xuanzhen Community
Mingxia Community
Xihe Community
Jianshe Community
Feishui Community
Chengxi Community

Villages
Huangkeng Village
Leyuan Village
Zhoutian Village
Feishui Village
Tajiao Village
Gaoxing Village
Wuxing Village
Jingtang Village
Xinzhou Village
Bailian Village
Wanshou Village

References 

Township-level divisions of Guangdong
Qingyuan